Women and Diamonds is a 1924 British silent crime film directed by F. Martin Thornton and starring Victor McLaglen, Madge Stuart and Florence Turner.

Cast
 Victor McLaglen as Brian Owen 
 Madge Stuart as Olive Seaton 
 Florence Turner as Mrs. Seaton 
 Norman Whalley as Ray Seaton 
 M.A. Wetherell as Barry Seaton 
 Walter Tennyson as Jimmy Foster 
 Simeon Stuart as Munro Clay 
 Clifton Boyne as Sweeney 
 Cecil del Gue as Jim Beverley

References

External links

1924 films
British silent feature films
British crime films
1920s English-language films
Films directed by Floyd Martin Thornton
1924 crime films
British black-and-white films
1920s British films